Aban and Khorshid (original title – Aban + Khorshid) is a 2014 American gay drama film written and directed by Darwin Serink.

The short film included in the DVD Boys On Film 14: Worlds Collide.

Synopsis 
Several episodes of sexual life of two lovers, and the subsequent brutal ending...
This film was based on real events.

Cast 
 Mojean Aria as Aban
 Bobby Naderi as Khorshid
 Stahaub Roudbari as Break in Guard
 Hamid Nayini as Guard #2
 Arash Rahdari as Guard #3
 Shahaub Roudbari as Execution Guard #1
 Homayoon Doroodian as Execution Guard #2

Participation in international festivals and awards 
2014:
 Casting Society of America (US)
 Image Out, The Rochester LGBT Film & Video Festival (US) -- Jury Award Winners: Best Short Film
 Iris Prize Festival – Cardiff (UK) – Highly Commended
  Long Island Gay & Lesbian Film Festival (US) – Short Film Awards: Men's – Jury Award, Audience Award
 Outfest (US) – Best of Fest
 Palm Springs International Film Festival (US) – Best of Fest
 SIFF, Seattle International Film Festival (US) – ShortsFest Award Winners: Live Action, Special Jury Mention, and Golden Space Needle Award – Best Short Film, Fourth runner-up

2015:
 Cannes Emerging Filmmakers Showcase, American Pavilion (France) – LGBTQ Showcase – winner
 CIFF 39, Cleveland International Film Festival (US) – Best LGBT Short
 GAZE International LGBT Film Festival – Dublin (Ireland) – Best International Short –  Winner

Reviews 
 "This is my first film at PSSF and it’s been great! I’ve been blown away by people’s responses to the film. I love watching it with an audience, hearing the heavy silences, hearing the focused attention, hearing the tears, hearing the hope..." (Tommee May, 2014-07-14).
 "Two Lovers, Even in Death" (Amos Lassen, 2016-02-15).

References

External links 
 
 

2014 short films
2014 films
2010s Persian-language films
American drama short films
American LGBT-related short films
2014 LGBT-related films
LGBT-related drama films
Gay-related films
2010s American films